HD 132029 is a star in the northern constellation of Boötes. It forms a double star with a magnitude 10.2 companion at an angular separation of 4.6″ along a position angle of 110° (as of 2010).

References

External links
 HR 5569
 CCDM J14560+3218
 Image HD 132029

Boötes
132029
Double stars
073068
A-type main-sequence stars
5569
Durchmusterung objects